Spartacus is a 1960 American epic historical drama film directed by Stanley Kubrick, written by Dalton Trumbo, and based on the 1951 novel of the same title by Howard Fast. It is inspired by the life story of Spartacus, the leader of a slave revolt in antiquity, and the events of the Third Servile War. It stars Kirk Douglas in the title role, Laurence Olivier as Roman general and politician Marcus Licinius Crassus, Peter Ustinov as slave trader Lentulus Batiatus, John Gavin as Julius Caesar, Jean Simmons as Varinia, Charles Laughton as Sempronius Gracchus, and Tony Curtis as Antoninus.

Douglas, whose company Bryna Productions was producing the film, removed original director Anthony Mann after the first week of shooting. Kubrick, with whom Douglas had made Paths of Glory (1957), was brought on board to take over direction. It was the only film directed by Kubrick where he did not have complete artistic control. Screenwriter Dalton Trumbo was blacklisted at the time as one of the Hollywood Ten. Douglas publicly announced that Trumbo was the screenwriter of Spartacus, and President John F. Kennedy crossed American Legion picket lines to view the film, helping to end blacklisting; Howard Fast's book had also been blacklisted and he had to self-publish the original edition.

The film won four Academy Awards (Best Supporting Actor for Ustinov, Best Cinematography, Best Art Direction and Best Costume Design), and became the biggest moneymaker in Universal Studios' history, until it was surpassed by Airport (1970).

In 2017, it was selected for preservation in the United States National Film Registry by the Library of Congress as being "culturally, historically, or aesthetically significant."

Plot 
In the first century BC, the Roman Republic has slid into corruption, its menial work done by armies of slaves. One of these, a proud and gifted Thracian named Spartacus, is so uncooperative in his position in a mining pit that he is sentenced to death by starvation. By chance, he is displayed to unctuous Roman businessman Lentulus Batiatus, who – impressed by his ferocity – purchases Spartacus for his gladiatorial school, where he instructs trainer Marcellus to not overdo his indoctrination because he thinks "he has quality". Amid the abuse, Spartacus forms a quiet relationship with a serving woman named Varinia, whom he refuses to rape when she is sent to "entertain" him in his cell. Spartacus and Varinia are subsequently forced to endure numerous humiliations for defying the conditions of servitude.

Batiatus receives a visit from the immensely wealthy Roman senator Marcus Licinius Crassus, who aims to become dictator of the stagnant republic. Crassus buys Varinia on a whim, and for the amusement of his companions arranges for Spartacus and three others to fight to the death. When Spartacus is disarmed, his opponent, an Ethiopian named Draba, spares his life in a burst of defiance and attacks the Roman audience, but is killed by an arena guard and Crassus. The next day, with the ludus' atmosphere still tense over this episode, Batiatus takes Varinia away to Crassus's house in Rome. Spartacus kills Marcellus, who was taunting him over his affections, and their fight escalates into a riot. The gladiators overwhelm their guards and escape into the Italian countryside.

Spartacus is elected chief of the fugitives and decides to lead them out of Italy and back to their homes. They plunder Roman country estates as they go, collecting enough money to buy sea transport from Rome's foes, the pirates of Cilicia. Countless other slaves join the group, making it as large as an army. One of the new arrivals is Varinia, who escaped while being delivered to Crassus. Another is a slave entertainer named Antoninus, who also fled Crassus's service after Crassus insinuated that he expected Antoninus to become his sex slave. Privately, Spartacus feels mentally inadequate because of his lack of education during years of servitude. However, he proves an excellent leader and organizes his diverse followers into a tough and self-sufficient community. Varinia, now his informal wife, becomes pregnant by him, and he also comes to regard the spirited Antoninus as a sort of son.

The Roman Senate becomes increasingly alarmed as Spartacus defeats the multiple armies it sends against him. Crassus's populist opponent Gracchus knows that his rival will try to use the crisis as a justification for seizing control of the Roman army. To try to prevent this, Gracchus channels as much military power as possible into the hands of his own protégé, a young senator named Julius Caesar. Although Caesar lacks Crassus's contempt for the lower classes of Rome, he mistakes the man's rigid outlook for a patrician. Thus, when Gracchus reveals that he has bribed the Cilicians to get Spartacus out of Italy and rid Rome of the slave army, Caesar regards such tactics as beneath him and goes over to Crassus.

Crassus uses a bribe of his own to make the pirates abandon Spartacus, and has the Roman army secretly force the rebels away from the coastline towards Rome. Amid panic that Spartacus means to sack the city, the Senate gives Crassus absolute power. Now surrounded by Roman legions, Spartacus persuades his men to die fighting. Just by rebelling and proving themselves human, he says that they have struck a blow against slavery. In the ensuing battle, after initially breaking the ranks of Crassus's legions, the slave army ends up trapped between Crassus and two other forces advancing from behind, and most of them are massacred. Afterward, the Romans try to locate the rebel leader for special punishment by offering a pardon (and return to enslavement) if the men will identify Spartacus, living or dead. Every surviving man responds by shouting "I'm Spartacus!". As a result, Crassus has them all sentenced to death by crucifixion along the Via Appia between Rome and Capua, where the revolt began.

Meanwhile, Crassus has found Varinia and Spartacus's newborn son and has taken them prisoner. He is disturbed by the idea that Spartacus can command more love and loyalty than he can, and hopes to compensate by making Varinia as devoted to him as she was to her former husband. When she rejects him, he furiously seeks out Spartacus (whom he recognizes from having watched him at Batiatus' school) and forces him to fight Antoninus to the death. The survivor is to be crucified, along with all the other men captured after the great battle. Spartacus kills Antoninus to spare him this terrible fate. The incident leaves Crassus worried about Spartacus's potential to live in legend as a martyr. In other matters, he is also worried about Caesar, who he senses will someday eclipse him.

Gracchus, having seen Rome fall into tyranny, commits suicide. Before doing so, he bribes his friend Batiatus to rescue Spartacus's family from Crassus and carry them away to freedom. On the way out of Rome, the group passes under Spartacus's cross. Varinia is able to comfort him in his dying moments by showing him his little son, who will grow up free and knowing who his father was.

Cast

Production 
The development of Spartacus was partly instigated by Kirk Douglas's failure to win the title role in William Wyler's Ben-Hur. Douglas had worked with Wyler before on Detective Story, and was disappointed when Wyler chose Charlton Heston, instead. Shortly after, Edward (Eddie) Lewis, a vice president in Douglas's film company, Bryna Productions (named after Douglas's mother), had Douglas read Howard Fast's novel, Spartacus, which had a related theme—an individual who challenges the might of the Roman Empire—and Douglas was impressed enough to purchase an option on the book from Fast with his own finances. Universal Studios eventually agreed to finance the film after Douglas persuaded Olivier, Laughton, and Ustinov to act in it. Olivier was also to direct the picture. Lewis became the producer of the film, with Douglas taking executive producer credit. Lewis subsequently produced other films for Douglas.

At the same time, Yul Brynner was planning his own Spartacus film for United Artists, with Douglas's agent Lew Wasserman suggesting he try having his film produced for Universal Studios. With Dalton Trumbo's screenplay being completed in two weeks, Universal and Douglas won the "Spartacus" race.

Douglas originally offered the role of Varinia to French actress Jeanne Moreau, but she didn't want to leave her boyfriend in France. German actress Sabine Bethmann was then cast. The studio gave her the anglicized name of "Sabina Bethman" for use in the film's publicity, but she was replaced by Jean Simmons after only days of filming.

Screenplay development 
Howard Fast was originally hired to adapt his own novel as a screenplay, but he had difficulty working in the format. He was replaced by Dalton Trumbo, who had been blacklisted as one of the Hollywood 10, and intended to use the pseudonym "Sam Jackson".

Kirk Douglas insisted that Trumbo be given screen credit for his work, which helped to break the blacklist. Trumbo had been jailed for contempt of Congress in 1950, after which he had survived by writing screenplays under assumed names. Douglas's intervention on his behalf was praised as an act of courage.

In his autobiography, Douglas states that this decision was motivated by a meeting that Edward Lewis, Stanley Kubrick, and he had regarding whose names to list for the screenplay in the film credits, given Trumbo's shaky position with Hollywood executives. One idea was to credit Lewis as co-writer or sole writer, but Lewis vetoed both suggestions. Kubrick then suggested that his own name be used. Douglas and Lewis found Kubrick's eagerness to take credit for Trumbo's work revolting, and the next day, Douglas called the gate at Universal saying, "I'd like to leave a pass for Dalton Trumbo." Douglas writes, "For the first time in 10 years, [Trumbo] walked on to a studio lot. He said, 'Thanks, Kirk, for giving me back my name.'

Blacklisting effectively ended in 1960, when it lost credibility. Trumbo was publicly given credit for two major films. Otto Preminger made public that Trumbo wrote the screenplay for his film Exodus, and Kirk Douglas publicly announced that Trumbo was the screenwriter of Spartacus. Further, President John F. Kennedy publicly ignored a demonstration organized by the American Legion and went to see the film.

Filming 
After David Lean turned down an offer to direct Spartacus, Anthony Mann was hired. Mann was then best known for his Westerns such as Winchester '73 and The Naked Spur. Douglas fired Mann at the end of the first week of shooting, during which the opening sequence in the quarry had been filmed. "He seemed scared of the scope of the picture," wrote Douglas in his autobiography, yet a year later, Mann would embark on another epic of similar size, El Cid. The dismissal (or resignation) of Mann is mysterious since the opening sequences, filmed at Death Valley, California, set the style for the rest of the film. Large parts of the film were shot at Wildwood Regional Park in Thousand Oaks, California. Parts were also filmed at nearby California Lutheran University, where an army can be seen storming off Mount Clef Ridge.

Thirty-year-old Stanley Kubrick was hired to take over. He had already directed four feature films (including Paths of Glory, also starring Douglas). Spartacus was a bigger project by far, with a budget of $12 million (equivalent to about $million in today's funds) and a cast of 10,500, a daunting project for such a young director. Paths of Glory, his previous film, had only been budgeted at $935,000. Kubrick immediately fired Sabine Bethmann, who had only worked two days on the film. He and Douglas felt that she wasn't right for the role, so she was paid $3,000 to go home. Bethmann was replaced with Jean Simmons, who had been campaigning for the role. Douglas had originally chosen to cast Bethmann over Simmons because he imagined Varinia having a strikingly different accent from the aristocratic Romans, who were to be played mostly by actors with British accents. Simmons was fortunately still available and took over the role in the film with only a day's notice.

Spartacus was filmed using the 35-mm Super 70 Technirama format and then blown up to 70 mm film. This was a change for Kubrick, who preferred using the standard spherical format. This process allowed him to achieve ultra-high definition and to capture large panoramic scenes. Kubrick had wanted to shoot the picture in Rome with cheap extras and resources, but Edward Muhl, president of Universal Pictures, wanted to make an example of the film and prove that a successful epic could be made in Hollywood itself, and "stem the flood of 'runaway' producers heading for Europe". A compromise was reached by filming the intimate scenes in Hollywood, and the battle scenes, at Kubrick's request, in Spain. Kubrick found working outdoors or in real locations to be distracting, and he believed the actors would benefit more from working on a sound stage, where they could fully concentrate. To create the illusion of the large crowds that play such an essential role in the film, Kubrick's crew used three-channel sound equipment to record 76,000 spectators at a Michigan State – Notre Dame college football game shouting "Hail, Crassus!" and "I'm Spartacus!"

The battle scenes were filmed on a vast plain outside Madrid. About 8,000 trained soldiers from the Spanish infantry were used to double as the Roman army. Kubrick directed the armies from the top of specially constructed towers. However, he eventually had to cut all but one of the gory battle scenes, due to negative audience reactions at test screenings. So precise was Kubrick, that even in arranging the bodies of the slaughtered slaves he had each "corpse" assigned with a number and instructions. Shooting locations also included the countryside near Guadalajara and Iriépal.

Disputes broke out during the filming. Cinematographer Russell Metty, a veteran with experience working in big pictures such as Orson Welles' The Stranger (1946) and Touch of Evil (1958) and Howard Hawks's Bringing Up Baby (1938), complained about Kubrick's unusually precise and detailed instructions for the film's camerawork, and disagreed with Kubrick's use of light. On one occasion, he threatened to quit to Ed Muhl, to which Kubrick told him: "You can do your job by sitting in your chair and shutting up. I'll be the director of photography."  Metty later muted his criticisms after winning the Oscar for Best Cinematography. Kubrick wanted to shoot at a slow pace of two camera set-ups a day, but the studio insisted that he do 32; a compromise of eight had to be made. Kubrick and Trumbo fought constantly over the screenplay. Kubrick complained that the character of Spartacus had no faults or quirks.

Despite the film being a huge box-office success, gaining four Oscars, and being considered to rank among the very best of historical epics, Kubrick later distanced himself from it. Although his personal mark is a distinct part of the final picture, his contract did not give him complete control over the filming, the only occasion he did not exercise such control over one of his films.

Music 
The original score for Spartacus was composed and conducted by six-time Academy Award-nominee Alex North. It was nominated by the American Film Institute for their list of greatest film scores. It is a textbook example of how modernist compositional styles can be adapted to the Hollywood leitmotif technique. North's score is epic, as befits the scale of the film. After extensive research of music of that period, North gathered a collection of antique instruments, while not authentically Roman, that provided a strong dramatic effect. These instruments included a sarrusophone, Israeli recorder, Chinese oboe, lute, mandolin, Yugoslav flute, kythara, dulcimer, and bagpipes. North's prize instrument was the ondioline, similar to an earlier version of the electronic synthesizer, which had never been used in film before. Much of the music is written without a tonal center, or flirts with tonality in ways that most film composers would not risk. One theme is used to represent both slavery and freedom, but is given different values in different scenes, so that it sounds like different themes. The love theme for Spartacus and Varinia is the most accessible theme in the film, and  a harsh trumpet figure was created for Crassus.

A soundtrack album was released on LP in 1960, containing selections from the score totaling 41 minutes. This album was released on CD in 1990, to coincide with the film's restoration. Soon after, Varèse Sarabande Records attempted to re-record 75 minutes of highlights from the score personally chosen by North, to be conducted by his friend and fellow film composer Jerry Goldsmith, but the project was delayed multiple times and remained unrecorded when Goldsmith died in 2004.

In 2010, Varèse Sarabande released a limited collector's edition of 5,000 copies, containing six CDs, one DVD, and a 168-page booklet. The first disc contained all 72 minutes of the score that survive in stereo, including all music from the 1960 album. Discs two and three featured the entire score to the film, in mono. Disc four contained alternate and preliminary cues from the original recording sessions. Discs five and six contained re-recordings of the film's iconic love theme, adapted by numerous modern film composers and other musicians. The DVD contained a documentary interviewing those same musicians about the score's impact.

Political commentary, Christianity, and reception 
The film parallels 1950s American history, specifically House Un-American Activities Committee (HUAC) hearings and the civil rights movement. The HUAC hearings, where witnesses were pressured to "name names" of communists and communist  sympathizers, mirror the climactic scene as the defeated slaves, ordered by Crassus to identify their leader from the multitude, individually stand up and proclaim, "I'm Spartacus". Howard Fast, author of the original novel, had written Spartacus while in prison for refusal to name names to HUAC investigators. At the beginning of the scene when Draba sacrifices himself by attacking Crassus rather than kill Spartacus, the film's narrator comments that slavery was a central issue in American history. The fight to end segregation and to extend equality to African Americans is symbolized in the racial mixing in the gladiatorial school, as well as in the army of Spartacus, where all must battle for freedom. Another allusion to the political situation in the United States is hinted at in the beginning, when Rome is described as a republic "fatally stricken with a disease called human slavery", describing Spartacus as a "proud, rebellious son dreaming of the death of slavery, 2000 years before it finally would die". Thus an ethical and political vision becomes a philosophical framework for the ensuing action.

The introductory voice-over also describes Rome as destined to collapse with the rise of Christianity:

In the last century before the birth of the new faith called Christianity, which was destined to overthrow the pagan tyranny of Rome and bring about a new society, the Roman Republic stood at the very center of the civilized world. "Of all things fairest" sang the poet, "First among cities and home of the Gods is Golden Rome." Yet even at the zenith of her pride and power, the Republic lay fatally stricken with the disease called human slavery. The age of the dictator was at hand, waiting in shadows for the event to bring it forth. In that same century, in the conquered Greek province of Thrace, an illiterate slave woman added to her master's wealth by giving birth to a son whom she names Spartacus. A proud, rebellious son, who was sold to living death in the mines of Libya, before his 13th birthday. There, under whip and chain and sun, he lived out his youth and his young manhood, dreaming the death of slavery 2000 years before it finally would die.

Thus, Rome is described as an oppressive state suffering from its own excesses in the years before the adoption of Christian beliefs begins to end Roman oppression and slavery.

While the film's release was occasioned applause from the mainstream media, it sparked protest from right-wing and anticommunist groups such as the National Legion of Decency, which picketed theaters exhibiting the film. The controversy over its "legitimacy as an expression of national aspirations" continued until newly elected US President John F. Kennedy crossed a picket line set up by anticommunist organizers to attend the film".

Release 

The film opened to the public on October 6, 1960, at the DeMille Theatre in New York City after four days of invitational previews. It played just 188 theatres in the United States and Canada in its first year and played for over a year at the DeMille before moving to the RKO Palace and opening in the New York circuit theaters around Thanksgiving 1961.

The film was re-released in 1967, without 23 minutes that had been in the original release. For the 1991 release, the same 23 minutes were restored by Robert A. Harris, as were another five minutes that had been cut from the film before its original release.

1991 restoration 
The idea for the film's restoration came about after the American Cinematheque asked Universal Pictures for a print of Spartacus following their then-recent tribute to Kirk Douglas. They were later informed that the original negatives had been cut twice and the colors were badly faded. Steven Spielberg gave his backing to the restoration effort and recommended that Stanley Kubrick be informed of the project. Kubrick, who had disowned the film, gave his approval to the effort and participated by providing detailed instructions through long-distance communication via phone and fax machine from London. Kubrick's print of the film, which was donated to the Museum of Modern Art, could not be used for the restoration because it was considered archival. The original studio black-and-white separation prints, used as a backup in 1960, were used, though the processing lab had to develop a new lens capable of printing the Technirama frame without losing fidelity. The restoration cost about $1 million.

A team of 30 archivists restored several violent battle sequences that had been left out because of the negative reaction of preview audiences. Among the deleted footage was a bath scene in which the Roman patrician and general Crassus attempts to seduce his slave Antoninus, speaking about the analogy of "eating oysters" and "eating snails" to express his opinion that sexual preference is a matter of taste rather than morality. The four-minute scene had been removed following an objection by the National Legion of Decency. When the film was restored (two years after Olivier's death), the original dialogue recording of this scene was missing; it had to be redubbed. Tony Curtis, by then 66, was able to re-record his part, but Crassus's voice was an impersonation of Olivier by Anthony Hopkins, who had been suggested by Olivier's widow, Joan Plowright. A talented mimic, Hopkins had been a protégé of Olivier's during Olivier's days as the National Theatre's artistic director, and had portrayed Crassus in the Jeff Wayne musical album. The actors separately recorded their dialogue.

For the 1991 theatrical re-release, Universal Pictures partnered with the American Film Institute, in which the restored film premiered at the Directors Guild of America Theater in Los Angeles on April 25, with the proceeds going towards the AFI Preservation Fund and the Film Foundation. The general release began in Los Angeles, New York City, and Toronto on the following day. On May 3, the release was expanded into an additional 31 cities in the United States and Canada.

Home media 
The film was first released on VHS in 1985 by MCA Home Video in a reconstructed version that reinstated most of the footage cut from subsequent reissues. The restored version was released on VHS by MCA/Universal in November 1991, and was subsequently released on LaserDisc by The Criterion Collection the following year. Criterion would later release the movie on DVD in 2001.

The film was released on Blu-ray in 2010 by Universal Pictures, but this release was panned by critics and fans alike, mainly due to the lackluster picture quality and sound. As a result, this release was highly controversial and did poorly in sales.

In 2015, for its 55th anniversary, the film went through an extensive 4K digital restoration, from a 6K scan of the 1991 reconstruction of the film, in which Robert A. Harris served as consultant. The 2015 restoration is 12 minutes longer and the original, six-channel audio track was also remixed and remastered in 7.1 surround sound. The film was re-released to Blu-ray Disc on October 6, 2015, featuring a 1080p transfer of the 2015 restoration in 2.20:1 aspect ratio and 7.1 DTS-HD Master Audio surround sound. Special features include a featurette on the 2015 restoration, a 2015 interview with Kirk Douglas, and several features from the Criterion Collection DVD.

On July 21, 2020, Universal Pictures Home Entertainment released a 4K Blu-ray disc of the film.

The 2015 restoration had originally been scheduled to have its theatrical premiere in March 2015 at the TCM Classic Film Festival, but was pulled from the festival, and from a July 2015 engagement in Chicago, because the restoration had not been completed in time. The DCP version of the restoration played at Film Forum in New York City, November 4–12, 2015.

Reception

Box office 
Spartacus was a commercial success upon its release and became the highest-grossing film of 1960. In its first year from 304 dates (including 116 in 25 countries outside the US and Canada), it had grossed $17 million, including nearly $1.5 million from over half a million admission in over a year  at the DeMille Theatre. By January 1963, the film had earned theatrical rentals of $14 million in the United States and Canada. The 1967 re-release increased its North American rentals to $14.6 million.

Critical response 

Variety declared in a contemporaneous review, "Spartacus appears to have what it takes to satisfy the multitudes ... Kubrick has out-DeMilled the old master in spectacle, without ever permitting the story or the people who are at the core of the drama to become lost in the shuffle. He demonstrates here a technical talent and comprehension of human values." John L. Scott of the Los Angeles Times praised the "fabulous cast," Trumbo's "expert screenplay" and "impressive" climactic battle scenes, writing, "Here young director Stanley Kubrick gives notice that from now on he's definitely to be reckoned with. His use of cameras and handling of people are very effective and skillful."

Richard L. Coe of The Washington Post wrote that the film "achieves the unlikely triumph of being intimate on a big scale, a lengthy spectacle consistently interesting for reasons that may vary from scene to scene." Harrison's Reports graded the film as "Very Good. A thinking man's star-studded spectacle." Brendan Gill of The New Yorker wrote that the protagonist's speeches "sound much more like Howard Fast ... talking to himself in the nineteen-fifties than they do like an illiterate warrior of the first century before Christ. What redeems the picture is several stretches of good acting, especially by Peter Ustinov and Laurence Olivier; the intrinsic interestingness of the physical details (accurately scaled interiors of Roman houses, Roman legions marching exactly as they must have marched); and the directorial aplomb of Stanley Kubrick, who handles his crowd scenes with extraordinary grace."

Stanley Kauffmann writing for The New Republic said of Spartacus, "entertaining if mindless show, with many well-done scenes, intimate and panoramic."

Not all reviews were positive. Bosley Crowther of The New York Times called the film a "spotty, uneven drama" that "comes out a romantic mish-mash of a strange episode in history. The performances are equally uneven. Mr. Douglas sets his blunt, horse-opera style against the toga-clad precision of Mr. Laughton and the Roman-nosed gentility of Mr. Olivier." The Monthly Film Bulletin found it "disappointing" that "in spite of enormous expenditure, technical resource and an unusually talented team, so much of Spartacus falls into the old ruts of cliché and sentiment." The review noted that Douglas "probably has fewer lines than any other hero in screen history. Unhappily he does not make up for his verbal deficiencies by mobility of countenance, maintaining the same wooden grimace through more than three hours of trial and suffering." When released, the movie was attacked by both the American Legion and the Hollywood columnist Hedda Hopper because of its connection with Trumbo. Hopper stated, "The story was sold to Universal from a book written by a commie and the screen script was written by a commie, so don't go to see it."

Roger Ebert, reviewing the 1991 restored version, gave the film three stars out of four and wrote, "Two things stand up best over the years: the power of the battle spectacles, and the strength of certain performances – especially Olivier's fire, Douglas' strength, and Laughton's mild amusement at the foibles of humankind. The most entertaining performance in the movie, consistently funny, is by Ustinov, who upstages everybody when he is onscreen (he won an Oscar)."

On Rotten Tomatoes the film has an approval rating of 93% based on 61 reviews, with an average rating of 8.2/10. The critical consensus states: "Featuring terrific performances and epic action, Kubrick's restored swords-and-sandals epic is a true classic." On Metacritic it has a weighted average score of 87% based on 17 critics, indicating "universal acclaim".

Awards and nominations 

In June 2008, American Film Institute revealed its "10 Top 10"—the best 10 films in 10 "classic" American film genres—after polling over 1,500 people from the creative community. Spartacus was acknowledged as the fifth-best film in the epic genre. AFI also included the film in AFI's 100 Years...100 Thrills (#62), AFI's 100 Years...100 Heroes and Villains (Spartacus #22 Hero), AFI's 100 Years...100 Movies (10th Anniversary Edition) (#81), and AFI's 100 Years...100 Cheers (#44).

"I'm Spartacus!" 

In the climactic scene, recaptured slaves are asked to identify Spartacus in exchange for leniency; instead, each slave proclaims himself to be Spartacus, thus sharing his fate. The documentary Trumbo suggests that this scene was meant to dramatize the solidarity of those accused of being Communist sympathizers during the McCarthy era, who refused to implicate others,  thus were blacklisted.

This scene is the basis for an in-joke in Kubrick's next film, Lolita (1962), where Humbert asks Clare Quilty, "Are you Quilty?" to which he replies, "No, I'm Spartacus. Have you come to free the slaves or something?" Many subsequent films, television shows, and advertisements have referenced or parodied the iconic scene. One of these is the film Monty Python's Life of Brian (1979), which reverses the situation by depicting an entire group undergoing crucifixion all claiming to be Brian, who, it has just been announced, is eligible for release ("I'm Brian." "No, I'm Brian." "I'm Brian and so's my wife.") Further examples have been documented in David Hughes' The Complete Kubrick and Jon Solomon's The Ancient World in Cinema.

The audio of the scene was also played at the start of each Roger Waters The Wall Live (2010–13) tour show as an introduction to the song "In the Flesh?".

In the U.S. version of The Office episode entitled Gossip, Michael Scott inadvertently reveals he does not understand the point of the "I am Spartacus!" moment. He says, “I've seen that movie half a dozen times, and I still don't know who the real Spartacus is” which he says is what makes the film a "classic whodunit.”

In other media 
In the american TV Show M*A*S*H, Hawkeye and BJ play charades, in which Spartacus is referenced.  However, M*A*S*H* takes place during the Korean War, which ended in 1953, a full seven years before Spartacus was released, thereby making BJ's reference to "Spartacus" a historical impossibility.

Comic-book adaptation 
 Dell Four Color #1139 (November 1960)

Films 
 Il Figlio di Spartacus (The Son of Spartacus; English title: The Slave) is a 1962 Italian unofficial sequel to the film.

See also 

 List of American films of 1960
 List of films set in ancient Rome
 List of historical drama films
 List of films featuring slavery
 List of war films and TV specials set between 3050 BC and AD 476
 Spartacus (2010–2013 TV series)

References

Citations

General sources

External links 

 
 
 
 
 "Rare, Never-Seen: Spartacus at 50"  at LIFE "Kirk Douglas: Rare Early Photos of a Hollywood Legend"
 "Spartacus"—an essay by Stephen Farber at the Criterion Collection
 Spartacus – Varese Sarabande 6-disc box set music review

1960 films
1960 drama films
1960 war films
1960s historical adventure films
1960s historical films
1960 LGBT-related films
American drama films
American epic films
American historical films
Best Drama Picture Golden Globe winners
Bisexuality-related films
Bryna Productions films
Cultural depictions of Marcus Licinius Crassus
Cultural depictions of Spartacus
Depictions of Julius Caesar on film
Films about gladiatorial combat
Films about rebels
Censored films
Films about slavery
Films adapted into comics
Films based on American novels
Films based on historical novels
Films directed by Stanley Kubrick
Films featuring a Best Supporting Actor Academy Award-winning performance
Films scored by Alex North
Films set in Capua
Films set in the 1st century BC
Films shot in Madrid
Films that won the Best Costume Design Academy Award
Films whose art director won the Best Art Direction Academy Award
Films whose cinematographer won the Best Cinematography Academy Award
Films with screenplays by Dalton Trumbo
Third Servile War films
United States National Film Registry films
Universal Pictures films
Films shot in the province of Guadalajara
1960s English-language films
1960s American films
Films about activists